James G. Sokolove (born October 4, 1944) is an American attorney known for advertising legal services on television. Though he was the largest legal advertiser in the United States in 2007, Sokolove's firm acts only as a lead generator and does not currently try cases.

The son of a personal injury lawyer, Sokolove was raised in Revere, Massachusetts. He received a B.A. from Case Western Reserve University in 1966 and a juris doctor from Suffolk University Law School in 1969. He also received a certificate in 1990 from Harvard Business School.  When Sokolove's father was diagnosed with Parkinson's disease, he took his father's place leading the family law firm. After several years, the law firm began to face mounting debts and split up. The failure led Sokolove to find a new way of gaining clients via television advertising. Sokolove's first ad, which featured a car crash filmed in slow motion, aired in 1982.

His advertising tactics were initially criticized by prominent Boston lawyers but proved successful. Overwhelmed by an influx of clients, he began referring clients to affiliate law firms for a portion of the legal fees they earned. The strategy was profitable enough that he told the Boston Business Journal in 1999 that by franchising his law firm he would "do for law what Staples did for office products." In 2009, Sokolove Law was referred to as "The Law Firm That Operates As An Ad Agency" by AdAge. 

Sokolove's law office now consists of 80 employees and over 300 affiliate firms in the United States.  By 2011, his associates had surpassed $1 billion in fees from their operations in every U.S. state. Sokolove's firm almost never litigates cases. It is almost entirely dependent upon referral fees.

He is known for the controversial style of his advertisements, which he describes as following a specific formula that boils down to "Injured? Free money." Above the Law's Elie Mystal referred to him as an "unabashed ambulance chaser."  Sokolove does not handle cases himself. He has not  gone inside a courtroom since the late 1970s. He has only argued one case in front of a jury, in the early 1970s, and lost.  Sokolove is a major supporter of the Democratic party, having donated over $250,000 in the past 10 years. During the 2008 presidential election he participated in door to door canvassing on behalf of Barack Obama.

, Sokolove's firm operated about 30 websites such as bulletin-boards to discuss injuries and forums for caregivers.

References

External links
Official website

1944 births
Living people
Lawyers from Boston
People from Revere, Massachusetts
Case Western Reserve University alumni
Harvard Business School alumni
Suffolk University Law School alumni